The 2013–14 Air Force Falcons women's basketball team represents United States Air Force Academy in the 2013–14 college basketball season. The Falcons, led by fourth year head coach Andrea Williams. The Falcons played their home games at the Clune Arena and were members of the Mountain West Conference. They finish the season with 1–28 overall, 0–18 in Mountain West play for a last place finish. They lost in the first round of the 2014 Mountain West Conference women's basketball tournament to San Diego State.

Roster

Schedule

|-
!colspan=9| Exhibition

|-
!colspan=9| Regular Season

|-
!colspan=9| 2014 Mountain West Conference women's basketball tournament

See also
2013–14 Air Force Falcons men's basketball team

References 

Air Force
Air Force Falcons women's basketball seasons
Air Force Falcons
Air Force Falcons